Zsófia Tóth (born 1 August 2003) is a Hungarian ice hockey goaltender and member of the Hungarian national ice hockey team, currently playing with the women's representative team of Hokiklub Budapest in the European Women's Hockey League (EWHL). She was named the Hungarian Female Goaltender of the Year by the Hungarian Ice Hockey Federation (MJSZ) in 2021.

Tóth made her debut with the Hungarian senior national team at the 2021 IIHF Women's World Championship. As a member of the Hungarian national under-18 team, she participated in the IIHF Women's World U18 Championship Division I A tournaments in 2018, 2019, and 2020. At the 2019 tournament, Tóth was named best goaltender as selected by the directorate.

Career statistics

International

Sources:

Awards and honors

References

External links 
 

Living people
2003 births
Ice hockey people from Budapest
Hungarian women's ice hockey goaltenders
KMH Budapest (women) players